Ammoplanina is a subtribe of aphid wasps in the family Crabronidae, subfamily Pemphredoninae. There are about 10 genera and at least 130 described species in Ammoplanina. In some phylogenetic analyses, this group is the sister lineage to the bees, and accorded family rank as Ammoplanidae so as to keep families monophyletic.

Genera
These 10 genera belong to the subtribe Ammoplanina:
 Ammoplanellus Gussakovskij, 1931 i c g
 Ammoplanops Gussakovskij, 1931 i c g b
 Ammoplanus Giraud, 1869 i c g b
 Ammostigmus Antropov, 2010 i c g
 Mohavena Pate, 1939 i c g
 Parammoplanus Pate, 1939 i c g b
 Protostigmus Turner, 1918 i c g
 Pulverro Pate, 1937 i c g b
 Riparena Pate, 1939 i c g
 Timberlakena Pate, 1939 i c g b
Data sources: i = ITIS, c = Catalogue of Life, g = GBIF, b = Bugguide.net

References

Further reading

 

Crabronidae